Filip Peliwo (born January 30, 1994) is a Canadian-born Polish professional tennis player. He reached a career-high ATP singles ranking of No. 161 on May 21, 2018. In 2022, he began competing for Poland.  Peliwo became the first Canadian male and second Canadian ever to win a Grand Slam in singles at any level with his 2012 Wimbledon boys' title win. This was Canada's second Grand Slam title in two days, one day after Eugenie Bouchard's. With the victory, Peliwo reached the No. 1 combined junior world ranking in July 2012, the first time a Canadian has been top ranked. He won his second straight junior Grand Slam title at the 2012 US Open. Peliwo was also runner-up in the boys singles events at the 2012 Australian Open and French Open.

Early life
Peliwo was born in Vancouver to Polish parents Mark and Monika. He played his early tennis through his teens at the North Shore Winter Club in North Vancouver BC and was part of the National Training Centre in Montreal from 2009 to 2012. He is the only one of three siblings not born in Poland.

Tennis career

Juniors
Peliwo reached the semifinals of the Orange Bowl in December 2011. At the beginning of 2012, he won the Grade 1 tournament in Traralgon, Australia after beating junior world No. 1 Luke Saville. He then reached the final of the junior Australian Open, where he lost to Saville. He reached his second straight Grand Slam final at the French Open, but lost this time to Kimmer Coppejans. After reaching his third Grand Slam final in a row in 2012 at Wimbledon, Peliwo won his first Grand Slam junior title there with a win over defending champion Luke Saville. He became the second Canadian to win a junior Grand Slam singles title, following Eugenie Bouchard who the day before won the Wimbledon girls' title. Peliwo reached his fourth straight junior Grand Slam final at the US Open, where he defeated Liam Broady to win his second Grand Slam title.

As a junior, he compiled a singles win–loss record of 92–44.

Junior Grand Slam results - Singles:

Australian Open: F (2012)
French Open: F (2012)
Wimbledon: W (2012)
US Open: W (2012)

Junior Grand Slam results - Doubles:

Australian Open: QF (2012)
French Open: 1R (2011, 2012)
Wimbledon: QF (2012)
US Open: 2R (2012)

2012

In March, Peliwo reached his first professional semifinal at the ATP Challenger in Rimouski, where he lost to compatriot Vasek Pospisil. In late August, Peliwo also reached the semifinals of the ITF Futures in Winnipeg, and the doubles final as well. He turned full-time professional in September, following his victory at the junior US Open. In November, Peliwo reached his first professional singles final at the ITF Futures in Mérida, but lost to fellow 18-year-old Lucas Pouille.

2013
In May, Peliwo reached his second doubles final but lost again, this time at the Futures in Heraklion to Joshua Milton and Andrew Whittington. He made it to his second singles final a week later at the Marathon Futures, but was defeated in three sets by Michal Konečný. As the 2012 junior champion, Peliwo was awarded a wildcard for the qualifying draw at Wimbledon. He defeated world No. 178 Bradley Klahn in the first round, but was eliminated by the sixth seed Denis Kudla in the next round. Peliwo reached the quarterfinals of the Challenger de Granby in July. The following week in Lexington, he made it to the second ATP Challenger semifinal of his career, where he was defeated by James Ward.

At the Masters 1000 Rogers Cup at the beginning of August, Peliwo was granted a wildcard into the main draw, his first appearance at an ATP Tour tournament. He scored an upset with a three-set win over world No. 39 Jarkko Nieminen in the first round when Nieminen retired at 1–3 in the third set. He was defeated in the next round by world No. 66 Denis Istomin in three sets. He made it to the doubles final for the second straight year at the Futures in Winnipeg, but lost once again. In late September, Peliwo won his first pro title at the Futures in Markham when compatriot Philip Bester gave him a walkover in the final.

2014
In March, Peliwo reached the fourth professional doubles final of his career at the Futures in Gatineau. He was defeated, with compatriot Kamil Pajkowski, by Edward Corrie and Daniel Smethurst. At the Grand Prix Hassan II in April, Peliwo successfully made it through three rounds of qualifying for the first time to get a spot in an ATP tournament main draw without the use of a wildcard. He defeated world No. 80 Filippo Volandri in his opening match, but was stopped in three sets by world No. 43 Federico Delbonis in the next round. In May, he reached the semifinals in doubles of the Samarkand Challenger. At the end of June, Peliwo reached his first singles final of the season at the Futures in Richmond where he was defeated by Dennis Novikov in three sets. At the Futures in Kelowna a week later, Peliwo made it to a second straight singles final but was this time defeated by Benjamin Mitchell. In July, he was awarded a wildcard in the main draw of the Citi Open but lost to Lukáš Lacko in the opening round. In September, Peliwo reached the doubles final of the Futures in Markham where he was defeated by Matt Seeberger and Rudolf Siwy.

2015–16
In February 2015, Peliwo captured his second pro singles title at the Futures in Feucherolles with a straight sets victory over Antal van der Duim. Two weeks later, he won his first professional doubles title after defeating Hiroyasu Ehara and Takashi Saito with partner Pietro Licciardi in the final. In August 2015, Peliwo was awarded a wildcard for the Rogers Cup singles main draw where he was defeated by world No. 60 Sergiy Stakhovsky in the opening round in three sets. In October 2015, he won the doubles title at the ITF Futures in Rodez with Fabien Reboul.

Peliwo won his fourth singles title at the ITF Futures in Toronto in September 2016, defeating Rhyne Williams in straight sets. The next week, he won the doubles title at the Futures in Niagara-on-the-Lake with compatriot Brayden Schnur.

2017
In April, Peliwo captured both the singles and doubles titles at the ITF Futures in Sharm El Sheikh. Two weeks later, he won his sixth ITF title with a victory over Issam Haitham Taweel again in Sharm El Sheikh. At the end of April, Peliwo won his third ITF singles title in four weeks with a straight sets victory over Moez Echargui at the Egypt F15 in Sharm El Sheikh. He also reached the doubles final. In May, Peliwo won his fourth ITF singles title in his last six tournaments after defeating Edan Leshem in the final in Herzliya. The next week, he captured his fifth ITF singles title of the season with a straight sets victory over Dekel Bar in Netanya. He made it to the doubles final as well. In July in Kelowna, he advanced to his sixth ITF Futures final of the season but was defeated by Alexander Sarkissian. He won the doubles title with Ronnie Schneider. The next week, Peliwo captured his sixth ITF singles title of the year with a victory over Marcos Giron in Saskatoon and reached the doubles final again with Schneider. In September at the Futures in Calgary, he reached his eight singles final of the season where he was defeated by Ulises Blanch. In November, he won his first ATP Challenger title, defeating Denis Kudla at the 75K in Knoxville.

2018
In March, Peliwo advanced to his first ATP Challenger doubles final in Drummondville, losing to Joris De Loore and Frederik Nielsen with partner Luis David Martínez.

Challenger and Futures/World Tennis Tour Finals

Singles: 26 (13–13)

Doubles: 18 (5–13)

Junior Grand Slam finals

Singles: 4 (2 titles, 2 runners-up)

Awards
2012 – ITF Junior World Champion

References

External links

1994 births
Living people
Canadian male tennis players
Polish male tennis players
Citizens of Poland through descent
Canadian people of Polish descent
Racket sportspeople from British Columbia
Sportspeople from Vancouver
US Open (tennis) junior champions
Wimbledon junior champions
Grand Slam (tennis) champions in boys' singles